Eric William Stromayer (born 1960) is an American diplomat who served as the United States ambassador to Togo from 2019 until 2022 and is currently the Chargé d'Affaires ad interim to Haiti.

Education 

Stromayer earned a Bachelor of Arts from Northwestern University and a Master of Arts from Johns Hopkins School of Advanced International Studies.

Career 

Stromayer is a career member of the Senior Foreign Service, class of Minister-Counselor. He has served as an American diplomat since 1989. He has served six tours at U.S. Missions overseas and in senior leadership positions at the United States Department of State, including as Chargé d'Affaires and Deputy Chief of Mission in Madagascar, Executive Director of the Bureau of African Affairs, Desk Officer at the Office of West African Affairs in the Bureau of African Affairs, and as General Services Officer at the U.S. Embassy in Ouagadougou, Burkina Faso. Recently he served as Acting Deputy Assistant Secretary for East Africa and the Sudans in the Bureau of African Affairs at the Department of State.

On August 16, 2018, President Donald Trump announced his intent to nominate Stromayer as the next United States Ambassador to Togo. On August 21, 2018, his nomination was sent to the United States Senate. On January 2, 2019, his nomination was confirmed in the United States Senate by voice vote. On April 11, 2019, he presented his credentials to President Faure Gnassingbé. He left the country on March 9, 2022.
Stromayer has been Chargé d'Affaires to Haiti since July 3, 2022.

Personal life 

Stromayer speaks French, Italian, Hungarian, Wolof, Haitian Creole, and some Spanish.

References

1960 births
Living people
Place of birth missing (living people)
20th-century American diplomats
21st-century American diplomats
Ambassadors of the United States to Togo
Northwestern University alumni
Paul H. Nitze School of Advanced International Studies alumni
United States Assistant Secretaries of State
United States Foreign Service personnel